Ravenstonedale is a civil parish in the Eden District, Cumbria, England. It contains 60 listed buildings that are recorded in the National Heritage List for England. Of these, one is listed at Grade I, the highest of the three grades, two are at Grade II*, the middle grade, and the others are at Grade II, the lowest grade.  The parish contains the villages of Ravenstonedale and Newbiggin-on-Lune and is otherwise rural.  Most of the listed buildings are houses and associated structures, farmhouses and farm buildings.  The other listed buildings include a church and items in the churchyard, chapels and associated structures, a public house, bridges, and milestones.


Key

Buildings

Notes and references

Notes

Citations

Sources

Lists of listed buildings in Cumbria